Kim Yong-sik (born 17 November 1967) is a Korean former wrestler who competed in the 1992 Summer Olympics.

References

External links
 
 
 

1967 births
Living people
Olympic wrestlers of North Korea
Wrestlers at the 1992 Summer Olympics
North Korean male sport wrestlers
Olympic bronze medalists for North Korea
Olympic medalists in wrestling
Asian Games medalists in wrestling
Wrestlers at the 1990 Asian Games
Medalists at the 1992 Summer Olympics
Asian Games gold medalists for North Korea
World Wrestling Championships medalists
Medalists at the 1990 Asian Games
20th-century North Korean people
21st-century North Korean people
World Wrestling Champions